Syeda Tahira Safdar (born 5 October 1957) is a Pakistani jurist served as the Chief Justice of Balochistan High Court.

She is the first female chief justice of any court in the history of Pakistan. Her nomination as chief justice of Balochistan High Court was confirmed by Chief Justice of Pakistan, Mian Saqib Nisar on 23 July 2018. On the provincial level, she has the honor of being the first lady in all posts she served in her life including being the first female civil judge in Balochistan in 1982.

Early life and education
She was born on 5 October 1957 in Quetta, Pakistan. Her father, Syed Imtiaz Hussain Baqri Hanafi, was a lawyer by profession. She completed her primary education from Cantonment Public School, Quetta, bachelor's degree from Government Girls College, Quetta, masters in Urdu literature from University of Balochistan and in 1980, a law degree from University Law College, Quetta.

Judicial career
In 1982, she became the first female civil judge of Balochistan. She passed the Balochistan Public Service Commission examination and was promoted to senior civil judge on 29 June 1987. She went on to become an additional district and sessions judge on 27 February 1991 and then as a full-fledged district and sessions judge on 1 March 1996. She also presided the Labor Court. She first became the member on 22 October 1998 and then the chairperson on 10 July 2009 of Balochistan Services Tribunal. She was elevated as an additional judge of Balochistan High Court on 7 September 2009. She became the judge of Balochistan High Court on 11 May 2011. In 2012, she attended a training in The Hague, Netherlands on the topic of International Law for Justice on Meeting International Human Rights Standards in Criminal Proceedings. She has been part of numerous other international conferences on topic of law throughout her judicial career. She has been serving as a member of the Administration Committee, the Promotion Committee and the Committee which drafts and examines the rules and their particulars and which also drafts regulations, circulars and notifications. She was confirmed to be the Chief Justice of Balochistan High Court on 23 July 2018 and took charge as such on 1 September 2018. In her capacity in this post, she became the first female chief justice of any court in Pakistan.

She is hearing the high treason case against former dictator Pervez Musharraf as part of a three-member special court which was approved by former prime minister Nawaz Sharif on 19 November 2013.

See also
Suman Kumari

References

Living people
1957 births
Pakistani judges
University of Balochistan alumni
People from Quetta
Chief Justices of the Balochistan High Court
Women chief justices
Pakistani women judges